William Pierre Robert (born August 1, 1955) is a radio disc jockey who, since 1981, has been a highly popular on-air personality for 93.3FM WMMR in Philadelphia, one of the nation's most recognized rock music stations.

He is known as WMMR's most identifiable personality, and is often described as a hippie by many locals. Robert is also famous for addressing his listeners as "citizens," as well as saying "Great day in the morning!"

Robert also holds significant stature in the American rock music industry, where he is held in high esteem by many rock musicians and groups, many of whom have granted Robert rare interviews and appeared in person on his program.

Radio career
Pierre Robert (pronounced "row-BEAR") began his radio career at 94.9 KSAN-FM, one of the country's first progressive rock stations, in his hometown of San Francisco. When KSAN changed its format to an Urban Country & Western style in the early 1980s Robert assumed the on-air name "Will Robertson" for a brief period of time because he was morally opposed to the new format.

Not long after, Robert joined a friend destined for school and moved to Philadelphia in Robert's 1970 Volkswagen van (named Minerva) with bald tires. He sent 93.3 WMMR a demo tape but was initially turned down. Pierre took a job at Essene (a health food store and vegetarian restaurant) until a fateful day at a palm reader's table on South Street, where he was told "you're gonna get a letter very soon". This letter was waiting for him at home and was from Joe Bonnadonna (then WMMR's station manager) indicating there was an opening. Robert joined WMMR in 1981.

Robert has had many positions at WMMR, including mornings, overnights and middays. His current time slot is from 10 a.m. to 3 p.m. though his program frequently runs longer (an anomaly explained as "Pierre Standard Time.")

Features of his show include the "Coffee Break Music Marathon", "Pierre's Planner" and the Work Force Blocks where he plays 3 to 4 song blocks of a particular artist based on listener requests.

In the 80s, Reginald the Butler joined Pierre in kicking off his work force blocks by ringing his lunchtime bell. 

Robert also features the "Vinyl Cut", where he plays a track from one of the many vinyl records in the WMMR archive.

He is also known to play all 18 minutes and 20 seconds of Arlo Guthrie's "Alice's Restaurant" multiple times during his annual Thanksgiving Day broadcast.

Robert has admitted that he does not follow Philadelphia sports. He typically refers to all Philadelphia sports teams as "The Boys in Blue" regardless of the actual team colors. As a running joke, he is known to say the phrase "Sports Up!" sarcastically—mostly during his overlap towards the end of the Preston and Steve Show.

Notable events 

Pierre's first VW micro-bus "Minerva" was impounded by the Philadelphia Parking Authority and later crushed in a junkyard.
Pierre Robert often declared on the air, "God Bless the Grateful Dead."  At the beginning of their concert at the old Spectrum on October 7, 1994, he presented the band with a flag recognizing their 50th performance at that venue.
In 2001, WMMR threw a party at The Philadelphia Spectrum for Pierre Robert's 20th anniversary and gave him a 1972 Volkswagen Type 2 (T2) Westfalia to replace his old 1970 VW mini-bus. This new bus was named "Minerva 2" in honor of the original Minerva that drove him from California to Pennsylvania.
In 2002, "Minerva 2" was driven by Pierre Robert in the 93.3 WMMR Ozz-Fund, a four-day fundraiser to collect money for the Fox Chase Cancer Center in the name of Ozzy Osbourne's wife Sharon Osbourne. Robert drove all over the Delaware Valley collecting donations from fans and station listeners
Throughout the first 25 days of November 2006, WMMR paid tribute to Pierre for his 25 years of service to the station.
In November 2011, Bob Beru of the Beru Revue played a show at The World Cafe Live in honor of Pierre's 30th year with WMMR.
In September 2012, the owners of the building that houses WMMR threatened to have "Minerva 2" towed. She was in pretty rough shape (tires flat, holes in the floorboard, and window broken). After considering all the options, Pierre was approached by CollisionMax about restoring Minerva. Minerva was completely restored by CollisionMax and custom airbrushing was done by Franny Drummond of PaintZoo. Rich Tornetta (Director of Marketing for CollisionMax) recorded weekly videos documenting the repair work done on the VW bus. The Minerva Project can be found here: http://www.collisionmax.com/minerva. An article was written about The Minerva Project on 4-3-2013 by Mark Ramsey Media.
In October 2019 Pierre was inducted into the Philadelphia Music Walk of Fame along with one of his favorite bands, The Hooters.
In 2021, to celebrate His 40th year with WMMR, the Studio that housed the station was renamed to the "Pierre Robert Studio"

References

External links

Philadelphia Weekly June 13, 2001 | Pierre celebrating his 20th year at WMMR
93.3 WMMR/Philadelphia Raises $20,000 for the Fox Chase Cancer Center In the Name of Sharon Osbourne
One of Us: Pierre Robert | PhillyMag.com
Beru Revue's 30th Anniversary Show at The World Cafe Live
Philly Ad Club November 2, 2006
WMMR Website
Philadelphia City Paper article on Robert from 1996
WMMR Celebrates 30 years with Pierre
Greater Media Special Feature "The Man. The Music. The Legend."

1955 births
Living people
 
DJs from San Francisco
Radio personalities from San Francisco